Joseph Kaddu Kutfesa (born 21 February 1970) is a Ugandan weightlifter. He competed in the men's lightweight event at the 1988 Summer Olympics.

References

External links
 

1970 births
Living people
Ugandan male weightlifters
Olympic weightlifters of Uganda
Weightlifters at the 1988 Summer Olympics
Place of birth missing (living people)